Cozzoli is an Italian surname. Notable people with the surname include:

 Mauro Cozzoli (born 1946), Italian Roman Catholic priest, theologian, and writer
 Michele Cozzoli (1915–1961), Italian composer, conductor, and arranger

Italian-language surnames